Kenneth Kamyuka (born December 5, 1981) is a Ugandan born Canadian cricketer. He is an all-rounder who bats right-handed and bowls right-arm fast-medium.

Kamyuka is regarded as being the best cricketer from Uganda and starred for them in the 2001 ICC Trophy. A clean hitter of the ball, he scored an unbeaten 100 batting at No 10 against Malaysia.

He later moved to Canada and after waiting four years to qualify to play for his adopted country, Kamyuka made his One Day International (OD) debut in 2013, against the Netherlands. He took a wicket with his first ball in ODI cricket.

References

External links
 

1981 births
Living people
Ugandan cricketers
Canada One Day International cricketers
Ugandan emigrants to Canada
People from Jinja District
Canadian cricketers